Erythrina tuxtlana is a species of legume in the family Fabaceae. It is found only in Mexico.

References 

tuxtlana
Flora of Mexico
Vulnerable plants
Taxonomy articles created by Polbot